Dublin Mid was a parliamentary constituency represented in Dáil Éireann, the lower house of the Irish parliament or Oireachtas from 1921 to 1923. The constituency elected 4 deputies (Teachtaí Dála, commonly known as TDs) to the Dáil, using proportional representation by means of the single transferable vote (PR-STV).

History 
The constituency was created in 1921 out of portions of the UK Parliament constituencies of Dublin College Green and Dublin Harbour. It was a four-seat constituency, under the Government of Ireland Act 1920, for the 1921 election to the House of Commons of Southern Ireland, whose members formed the 2nd Dáil. It was abolished under the Electoral Act 1923.

Boundaries 
The constituency consisted of the College Green and the Dublin Harbour divisions of Dublin city.

TDs

Elections

1922 general election

1921 general election 

|}

See also 
Dáil constituencies
Politics of the Republic of Ireland
Historic Dáil constituencies
Elections in the Republic of Ireland

References

External links 
Oireachtas Members Database
Text of the Government of Ireland Act as originally enacted in 1920

Dáil constituencies in County Dublin (historic)
1921 establishments in Ireland
1923 disestablishments in Ireland
Constituencies established in 1921
Constituencies disestablished in 1923